Zane (Arabic: زان ) is a village in Batroun District, North Governorate, Lebanon. The town is a member of Federation of Mantaket Batroun Municipalities. The name comes from the Syriac word Zayno, meaning weapon. The majority of the town is Maronite and there are 160 houses in the town with 760 people.

References

Batroun District
Populated places in the North Governorate
Maronite Christian communities in Lebanon